Eleanor Campbell may refer to:

 Eleanor Campbell (physician) (1878–1959), American physician
 Eleanor Campbell (scientist) (born 1960), Scottish chemist
 Eleanor Campbell (illustrator) (1894–1986), illustrator of children's books and portrait artist
 Eleanor Campbell, Duchess of Argyll, British noblewoman